Elizabeth of Hungary most commonly refers to Saint Elizabeth, Landgravine of Thuringia, daughter of King Andrew II of Hungary.

Elizabeth of Hungary may also refer to:

Elizabeth of Hungary, Duchess of Greater Poland (c. 1128–1154), daughter of King Béla II of Hungary
Elizabeth of Hungary, Duchess of Bohemia (1145–1189)
Elizabeth of Hungary, Duchess of Bavaria (1236–1271), daughter of King Béla IV of Hungary
Elizabeth of Hungary, Queen of Serbia (c. 1255–1313), daughter of King Stephen V of Hungary
Elizabeth of Töss (1292–1336 or 1338), Dominican nun, daughter of King Andrew III of Hungary
Elizabeth of Slavonia (1352–before 1380), Princess of Taranto, granddaughter of King Charles I of Hungary
Elizabeth of Austria (1436–1505), wife of King Casimir IV of Poland